Benjamin McDonald (born July 20, 1962) is an American former professional basketball player and former assistant coach for the Reno Bighorns of the NBA Development League. He played college basketball for the California-Irvine Anteaters. After graduating, he played for the Cleveland Cavaliers for one season and the Golden State Warriors for three seasons. In 176 games, he averaged 21.0 minutes and 6.0 points per game.  After his NBA career, McDonald played for Israeli team Hapoel Holon, and  also played two seasons in the Continental Basketball Association for the Albany Patroons, San Jose Jammers and Oklahoma City Cavalry.  For his CBA career, McDonald averaged 7.6 points and 5.8 rebounds in 70 games.

References

1962 births
Living people
African-American basketball players
Albany Patroons players
American expatriate basketball people in Germany
American expatriate basketball people in Israel
American expatriate basketball people in Portugal
American expatriate basketball people in Spain
American men's basketball players
Basketball coaches from California
Basketball players from Torrance, California
CB Peñas Huesca players
Cleveland Cavaliers draft picks
Cleveland Cavaliers players
Erie BayHawks (2008–2017) coaches
FC Porto basketball players
Giessen 46ers players
Golden State Warriors players
Hapoel Holon players
Indiana Hoosiers men's basketball coaches
Liga ACB players
Oklahoma City Cavalry players
Power forwards (basketball)
Real Madrid Baloncesto players
Reno Bighorns coaches
San Jose Jammers players
Small forwards
UC Irvine Anteaters men's basketball players
21st-century African-American people
20th-century African-American sportspeople
Long Beach Polytechnic High School alumni